VicRail may refer to:

Vic Rail - an Australian horse race trainer
Victorian Railways - a trading name of an Australian train operator